{{DISPLAYTITLE:Gs alpha subunit}}

The Gs alpha subunit (Gαs, Gsα) is a subunit of the heterotrimeric G protein Gs that stimulates the cAMP-dependent pathway by activating adenylyl cyclase. Gsα is a GTPase that functions as a cellular signaling protein. 
Gsα is the founding member of one of the four families of heterotrimeric G proteins, defined by the alpha subunits they contain: the Gαs family, Gαi/Gαo family, Gαq family, and Gα12/Gα13 family. The Gs-family has only two members: the other member is Golf, named for its predominant expression in the olfactory system. In humans, Gsα is encoded by the GNAS complex locus, while Golfα is encoded by the GNAL gene.

Function

The general function of Gs is to activate intracellular signaling pathways in response to activation of cell surface  G protein-coupled receptors (GPCRs). GPCRs function as part of a three-component system of receptor-transducer-effector. The transducer in this system is a heterotrimeric G protein, composed of three subunits: a Gα protein such as Gsα, and a complex of two tightly linked proteins called Gβ and Gγ in a Gβγ complex. When not stimulated by a receptor, Gα is bound to GDP and to Gβγ to form the inactive G protein trimer. When the receptor binds an activating ligand outside the cell (such as a hormone or neurotransmitter), the activated receptor acts as a guanine nucleotide exchange factor to promote GDP release from and GTP binding to Gα, which drives dissociation of GTP-bound Gα from Gβγ. In particular, GTP-bound, activated Gsα binds to adenylyl cyclase to produce the second messenger cAMP, which in turn activates the cAMP-dependent protein kinase (also called Protein Kinase A or PKA). Cellular effects of Gsα acting through PKA are described here.

Although each GTP-bound Gsα can activate only one adenylyl cyclase enzyme, amplification of the signal occurs because one receptor can activate multiple copies of Gs while that receptor remains bound to its activating agonist, and each Gsα-bound adenylyl cyclase enzyme can generate substantial cAMP to activate many copies of PKA.

Receptors
The G protein-coupled receptors that couple to the Gs family proteins include:
 5-HT receptors types 5-HT4 and 5-HT7
 ACTH receptor a.k.a. MC2R
 Adenosine receptor types A2a and A2b
 Arginine vasopressin receptor 2
 β-adrenergic receptors types β1, β2 and β3
 Calcitonin receptor
 Calcitonin gene-related peptide receptor
Cannabinoid receptor 2
 Corticotropin-releasing hormone receptor
 Dopamine receptors D1-like family (D1 and D5), mainly through Golf in the striatum
 FSH-receptor
 Gastric inhibitory polypeptide receptor
 Glucagon receptor
 Growth-hormone-releasing hormone receptor
 Histamine H2 receptor
 Luteinizing hormone/choriogonadotropin receptor
 Melanocortin receptor: MC1R, MC2R (a.k.a. ACTH receptor), MC3R, MC4R, MC5R
 Olfactory receptors, through Golf in the olfactory neurons
 Parathyroid hormone receptor 1
 Prostaglandin receptor types D2 and I2
 Secretin receptor
 Thyrotropin receptor
 Trace amine-associated receptor 1

See also
 Second messenger system
 G protein-coupled receptor
 Heterotrimeric G protein
 Adenylyl cyclase
 Protein kinase A
 Gi alpha subunit
 Gq alpha subunit
 G12/G13 alpha subunits

References

External links
 
 
 

Peripheral membrane proteins
Medical mnemonics